Janus kinase and microtubule interacting protein 2 is a protein that in humans is encoded by the JAKMIP2 gene.

Function

The protein encoded by this gene is reported to be a component of the Golgi matrix. It may act as a golgin protein by negatively regulating transit of secretory cargo and by acting as a structural scaffold of the Golgi. Alternative splicing results in multiple transcript variants.

References

Further reading